Bianca Ursula Schmidt (born 23 January 1990) is a German footballer. She plays as a defender for FC Rosengård and the German national team.

Career
Bianca Schmidt has combined her football career with her duties as a soldier in the Sports Promotion Group of the German Army.

Club
Schmidt began her career at the age of seven with TSV 1880 Gera-Zwötzen. The club changed its name to 1. FC Gera 03 after a merger in 2003. During her entire youth career up to Under-15 level in the 2005–06 season, she played as the only girl on the team and only knew women's football from state selection squads and junior national teams.
 
In 2006, Schmidt moved to the reigning German club champions 1. FFC Turbine Potsdam while she attended the Friedrich Ludwig Jahn Potsdam Sport School, which has an elite programme for girls' football. The school has very close links with the FFC Turbine Potsdam club. Schmidt soon became a regular starter for the team. She scored eight goals in her first Bundesliga season and won the Fritz Walter bronze medal as the third best female junior player of the year. At Potsdam, Schmidt won four Bundesliga titles in a row from 2009 to 2012. She also claimed the UEFA Women's Champions League in the 2009–10 season with the team, where she scored during the penalty shoot-out in the final. One year later, Potsdam again made it to the final, but lost against Olympique Lyonnais.

In summer 2012, Schmidt was transferred to 1. FFC Frankfurt. In summer 2015, she rejoined 1. FFC Turbine Potsdam.

In July 2021, Schmidt joined FC Rosengård with a two year contract until the summer 2023.

International
Starting at Under-15 level, Schmidt played for several German junior national teams. She won the 2007 UEFA Women's Under-19 Championship and claimed third-place at the 2008 FIFA U-20 Women's World Cup. She made her debut for Germany's senior national team in February 2009 against China. Later that year Schmidt was called up and was a regular starter for Germany at the 2009 European Championship, which the team won. In 2010, she returned to play in a junior competition, winning the 2010 FIFA U-20 Women's World Cup on home soil in Germany. Schmidt was called up for Germany's 2011 FIFA Women's World Cup squad.

International goals
Scores and results list Germany's goal tally first:

Source:

Honours

Club
Turbine Potsdam
UEFA Women's Champions League: Winner 2009–10
Bundesliga: Winner 2008–09, 2009–10, 2010–11, 2011–12
 DFB-Hallenpokal for women: Winner 2008, 2009

1. FFC Frankfurt
DFB-Pokal: Winner 2014
UEFA Women's Champions League: Winner 2014–15

International
UEFA European Championship: Winner 2009, 2013
FIFA U-20 Women's World Cup: Winner 2010, Third-place (1) 2008
UEFA U-19 Women's Championship: Winner 2007
Algarve Cup: Winner 2012, 2014

Individual
Fritz Walter Medal – Bronze: 2007

References

External links

 Profile  at DFB
 Player German domestic football stats  at DFB
 
 Profile at 1. FFC Turbine Potsdam 
 

1990 births
Living people
Sportspeople from Gera
People from Bezirk Gera
German women's footballers
German expatriate women's footballers
Footballers from Thuringia
Germany women's international footballers
Women's association football midfielders
1. FFC Turbine Potsdam players
2011 FIFA Women's World Cup players
2015 FIFA Women's World Cup players
UEFA Women's Championship-winning players
1. FFC Frankfurt players
Frauen-Bundesliga players
20th-century German women
FC Rosengård players
Expatriate women's footballers in Sweden
German expatriate sportspeople in Sweden